The 2014 United States Senate election in Maine took place on November 4, 2014. Incumbent Republican Senator Susan Collins, who has served in the position since 1997, won reelection to a fourth term in office with 68% of the vote. The primary elections were held on June 10, 2014.

Republican primary

Candidates

Declared 
 Susan Collins, incumbent U.S. Senator

Write-in candidates 
 Erick Bennett, conservative activist and director of the Maine Equal Rights Center (unenrolled as a Republican, see Campaign section)

Declined 
 Scott D'Amboise, former Lisbon Falls Selectman and candidate for the U.S. Senate in 2012
 Bruce Poliquin, former State Treasurer, candidate for Governor in 2010 and candidate for the U.S. Senate in 2012 (ran for ME-02)
 Mark Willis, former Maine Republican National Committeeman

Campaign 
Maine Republican Party Chairman Rick Bennett was critical of Erick Bennett's campaign, stating that he did not believe Erick would get the necessary signatures to get on the ballot.  After making it clear the two men are not related, Rick felt that this would be due to Erick's views as expressed on his Facebook page. These included referring to U.S. Representative Mike Michaud as a "closet homo" and criticism of Nelson Mandela, comparing him to Stalin and Karl Marx.
Furthermore, Erick Bennett was convicted in 2003 of assaulting his wife, which was upheld by the Maine Supreme Judicial Court, though he maintains his innocence. Rick Bennett stated that Erick's views "do not represent the views of the Republican Party".

Erick Bennett announced before the primary filing deadline on March 17 that he had left the Republican Party and would run as an independent. Maine law, however, requires that an independent candidate must have not been in a political party by March 1 of the election year in order to run as an independent, meaning Bennett cannot legally run as such.  The Kennebec Journal has reported that Bennett is a write-in candidate for the Republican nomination.

On April 3, 2014, Collins' campaign announced the joint endorsement of Bath Iron Works' labor unions, which the campaign claimed was the first time the unions issued a joint endorsement as well as the first time they endorsed a Republican candidate for federal office.

Polling

Results

Democratic primary

Candidates

Declared 
 Shenna Bellows, former executive director of the American Civil Liberties Union of Maine

Declined 
 Emily Cain, state senator (ran for ME-02)
 Mike Michaud, U.S. Representative (ran for Governor)

Results

Independents 
To qualify as an independent candidate for the U.S. Senate in Maine, a candidate needs to submit at least 4,000 valid signatures to the secretary of state by June 1. Any independent candidate must not have been enrolled in a political party after March 1 of the year the election occurs.

Former Republican candidate Erick Bennett announced just before the March 17 primary filing deadline that he had left the Republican Party and would run as an independent, but Maine law required him to have unenrolled as a Republican by March 1 to do so. Therefore, he could not legally run as an independent.

Candidates

Declared 
 Erick Bennett, conservative activist and director of the Maine Equal Rights Center (unenrolled as a Republican, see Campaign section)

Declined 
 Mike Turcotte, adjunct professor at Eastern Maine Community College

General election

Background 
Heading into the 2014 cycle, only 12 U.S. Senate elections had involved two major party female nominees in U.S. history.

Candidates 
 Susan Collins (Republican), incumbent U.S. Senator
 Shenna Bellows (Democratic), former executive director of the Maine ACLU

Endorsements

Predictions

Polling 

 * Internal poll for Shenna Bellows campaign

With Collins

With Poliquin

With Summers

Results 
The election was not close, with Collins winning all 16 of Maine's counties, each by a margin of at least 24 percentage points.

See also 

 2014 United States Senate elections
 2014 United States elections
 2014 United States House of Representatives elections in Maine
 2014 Maine gubernatorial election

References

External links 
 U.S. Senate elections in Maine, 2014 at Ballotpedia
 Campaign contributions at OpenSecrets

2014
Maine
United States Senate